Cima Rossa is a 3,161 metres high mountain in the Lepontine Alps, located on the border between the cantons of Ticino and Graubünden. On the west side it overlooks the valley of Malvaglia (Ticino) and on the east side it overlooks the valley of Calanca (Graubünden).

Cima Rossa is connected to the higher massif of the Vogelberg by a four km ridge, not descending lower than 2,925 metres. A secondary summit (3,121 metres) named Piz Piotta lies north of the summit of Cima Rossa. A small glacier lies between them on the west flanks, named Ghiacciaio di Piotta.

References

External links
Cima Rossa on Hikr.org

Mountains of the Alps
Alpine three-thousanders
Mountains of Switzerland
Mountains of Graubünden
Mountains of Ticino
Graubünden–Ticino border
Lepontine Alps
Mesocco
Rossa, Switzerland